is a railway station in Ōta, Tokyo, Japan.  The station is right on the border between the wards of Meguro and Ōta. The station is facing the main campus of the Tokyo Institute of Technology. Connected to the station is the Tokyu Hospital.

Lines
This station is served by the Tōkyū Ōimachi Line and Tōkyū Meguro Line.

Station layout
This station consists of two island platforms serving four tracks. All platforms are underground and are connected by a surface building.

Around the station
 Tokyo Institute of Technology
 Ōokayama Kitaguchi Shopping Street

References

Railway stations in Japan opened in 1927
Railway stations in Tokyo